Royce Glenn Sutton (September 28, 1937 – April 17, 2007) was an American country music songwriter, record producer, and one of the architects of the countrypolitan sound.

Biography
Sutton wrote or co-wrote many of Tammy Wynette's early hits including, "Your Good Girl's Gonna Go Bad", "Take Me to Your World" (which would be the last song Wynette ever sang in concert before her death in 1998), "I Don't Wanna Play House, "The Ways to Love a Man", "Kids Say the Darndest Things", and "Bedtime Story". He also wrote the song "What's Made Milwaukee Famous (Has Made a Loser Out of Me)" (recorded by Jerry Lee Lewis, Rod Stewart, and Lynn Anderson), as well as the David Houston classic "Almost Persuaded". Sutton won a Grammy Award for the latter composition. "Almost Persuaded" has been covered by artists from all genres of music, including R&B legend Etta James. He also sang his own hit called "The Football Card" which nearly made the top forty on the Billboard Hot 100.

Sutton is also well known for his personal and professional association with Lynn Anderson, his wife from 1968 to 1977. He produced many of her hit recordings, including her signature-mega hit "(I Never Promised You a) Rose Garden". The album, by the same name as the single, reached number one in 16 countries around the globe and was the biggest selling album by a female country artist from 1971 until 1997. Sutton received a RIAA Platinum Award for producing "(I Never Promised You a) Rose Garden". Although he did not write "(I Never Promised You a) Rose Garden", he wrote several of Anderson's number one hits.

He was awarded numerous BMI and ASCAP Awards for his hit compositions. Artists who have recorded Glenn Sutton penned songs, reads like a "who's who" in the recording industry. He was inducted into the Nashville Songwriters Hall of Fame in 1999.

Sutton died in Nashville on April 17, 2007, of a heart attack, aged 69.

References

External links
Bio at Nashville Songwriters Foundation
Photos of Glenn's posted on Flickr.com.  Many are pictures of Glenn, while others seem to be photos he took.

1937 births
2007 deaths
People from Jackson Parish, Louisiana
American country songwriters
American male songwriters
Record producers from Louisiana
Songwriters from Louisiana
Ace Records (United States) artists
Grammy Award winners
20th-century American composers
20th-century American male musicians